"Together Again" is a song recorded by American boy band NSYNC for their self-titled debut album (1997). It was released as the fifth single from the album on October 31, 1997, by Trans Continental Records and BMG Ariola. The song was written by Andy Reynolds and Tee Green and produced by Gary Carolla.

Music video
The music video for "Together Again" premiered in September 1997. The video features the band performing in a Christmas playroom, reminiscing about their own childhoods. The video shows pictures of the boys when they were younger, and changes the theme of the song to relate to the break-up between their selves and their parents. The video also shows the boys celebrating Christmas together.

Track listing
CD single
"Together Again" (radio edit) – 3:25
"Together Again" (album version) – 4:09
"Giddy Up" – 4:07
"Some Dreams" – 4:18

Charts

Release history

References

1997 singles
NSYNC songs
Song recordings produced by Denniz Pop
Song recordings produced by Max Martin
Pop ballads
1990s ballads